The Fédération Internationale des Sociétés d'Ingénieurs des Techniques de l'Automobile (FISITA) is the international federation that brings together the global automotive mobility sector to share ideas and advance automotive technological development

FISITA was founded in Paris in 1948 with the purpose of bringing engineers from around the world together in a spirit of cooperation to share ideas and advance the technological development of the automobile.  The federation's first president was the eminent French engineer, Maurice Norroy.

Today FISITA represents more than 210,000 automotive engineers worldwide.

FISITA's mission is to help create efficient, affordable, safe and sustainable automotive transportation.  It serves as a global forum for dialogue between engineers, industry, government, academia, environmental and standards organizations.

Among many of FISITA's activities is the organisation of the biennial FISITA World Automotive Congress – one of the biggest international meetings of engineers, scientists and executives working in the automotive industry.

Other activities include http://www.yourfutureinautomotive.com a website for students and young engineers providing education information, travel bursary information, educational resources, career guidance and much more to help support the education and training of students and young engineers.

FISITA and Your Future in automotive also launched a series of video interviews with engineers working across the automotive industry to show students and engineers exactly what a career in automotive is like: https://www.youtube.com/user/YourFutureInAuto/videos.

European Automobile Engineers Cooperation (EAEC) is a cooperation within the core of FISITA.

See also

Society of Automotive Engineers
Société des ingénieurs de l'automobile

External links

2016 FISITA World Automotive Congress
EuroBrake 2015
Your Future In Automotive website for students and young engineers

Automotive industry
Defunct organizations based in France
Engineering societies based in France
International organisations based in the United Kingdom
International trade associations
Organisations based in Essex
Science and technology in Essex
Uttlesford